"Hurry Xmas" is the thirty-fourth single by L'Arc-en-Ciel, released on November 14, 2007. There are two editions of the original single, a regular and a special edition. The special edition was packaged in a gift box, includes a DVD with two music videos for the A-side and B-side, a photograph of the band, and a Christmas ornament.

It was also re-released on November 26, 2008, and again on December 9, 2009. The 2009 special edition was packaged in a gift box, included a DVD with two live videos for the A-side and B-side, a new photograph of the band, and a new Christmas ornament. The single was re-released again on November 24, 2010.

The 2007 original release reached number 2 on the Oricon chart. The 2008, 2009 and 2010 re-releases reached number 8, 5, and 19 respectively.

Track listing

References

2007 singles
L'Arc-en-Ciel songs
Japanese-language songs
Songs written by Hyde (musician)
Japanese Christmas songs
2007 songs
Ki/oon Music singles